Gabriel Martínez-Ábrego (born 16 September 1998) is a Mexican motorcycle racer. He is the first Mexican-born rider to ever take part in a World Championship race during the Gran Premio Movistar de Aragón.

Career statistics

Grand Prix motorcycle racing

By season

Races by year

External links

Living people
Mexican motorcycle racers
Moto3 World Championship riders
1998 births
People from Monterrey